The DVV Trophy 2016–17 is a season long cyclo-cross competition. This edition continues to follow the ranking system which uses time instead of points.

Calendar

Men's competition

Women's competition

Rankings

Men

GP Mario De Clercq

Koppenbergcross

Flandriencross

Grand Prix Rouwmoer

Scheldecross Antwerpen

Azencross

Grand Prix Sven Nys

Krawatencross

Women

Overall standings

Notes

References

Cyclo-cross BPost Bank Trophy
2016 in cyclo-cross
2017 in cyclo-cross